is a Japanese snowboarder. She represented Japan at the 2022 Winter Olympics.

Career

Junior World Championships
Ono made her international debut at the 2018 FIS Snowboarding Junior World Championships where she won gold in the halfpipe event. She competed at the 2019 FIS Snowboarding Junior World Championships where she again won gold in the halfpipe event.

Winter Youth Olympics
Ono represented Japan at the 2020 Winter Youth Olympics where she won a gold medal in the girl's halfpipe event with a score of 95.33.

Winter Olympics
Ono represented Japan at the 2022 Winter Olympics in the women's halfpipe event.

World Championships
Ono represented Japan at the 2023 FIS Snowboard World Championships, where she scored an 83.00 and won a bronze medal in the halfpipe event.

References

 

2004 births
Living people
Japanese female snowboarders
Snowboarders at the 2020 Winter Youth Olympics
Snowboarders at the 2022 Winter Olympics
Olympic snowboarders of Japan
Youth Olympic gold medalists for Japan
21st-century Japanese women
X Games athletes